Marines is a municipality in the comarca of Camp de Túria in the Valencian Community, Spain.

Population

Main city and holiday colony 
The town of Marines includes Marines Viejo, a holiday colony from the resettled original site of the town.

References

Municipalities in Camp de Túria
Populated places in Camp de Túria